Khorram Rud Rural District may refer to:
 Khorram Rud Rural District (Hamadan Province)
 Khorram Rud Rural District (Isfahan Province)